Char Nizam, also known as Char Nizam Kalkini, is a remote island in the Meghna river delta in the Bhola district of Bangladesh. The closest body of land is Dhal Char, a similar, albeit larger island to the west. 

Char Nizam is home to 250 families.

History
Char Nizam was discovered in the mid 1980 and was soon after settled by people.

References

Islands of Bangladesh